Dune Za Keyih Provincial Park and Protected Area, also known as the Frog-Gataga Provincial Park, is a provincial park in British Columbia, Canada. It is part of the larger Muskwa-Kechika Management Area and is located in the area of the Gataga River, between Denetiah Provincial Park, which lies west across the Kechika River, and Kwadacha Wilderness Provincial Park to its east. Established in 2001 as Frog-Gataga, the park is 346,833 hectares in area; its newer name is a Kaska Dena translation of Frog-Gataga.

See also
Dane-zaa

References

Provincial parks of British Columbia
Liard Country
Cassiar Mountains
Kaska Dena
2001 establishments in British Columbia
Protected areas established in 2001